Wawrzka  (Vafka) is a village in the administrative district of Gmina Grybów, within Nowy Sącz County, Lesser Poland Voivodeship, in southern Poland.

References

Wawrzka